Consort Xu may refer to:
Empress Dowager Xu (died 926), known as Consort Xu (徐賢妃) of the Former Shu, before she became empress dowager 
Madame Huarui (940–976), also known as Consort Xu (徐惠妃) of the Later Shu